Cheon Min-ho (born 6 April 1987) is a Korean sport shooter.

He was born in Gyeongsangbuk, South Korea.  He competed in the 2004 Summer Olympic Games in Athens, Greece, in Men's Air Rifle, 10 metres, coming in fourth.

He shares the world junior record in the 10 m air rifle competition, a 599 in April 2004, in Athens, Greece.

Current world record in 10 m air rifle

References

External links

1987 births
Living people
South Korean male sport shooters
Shooters at the 2004 Summer Olympics
Olympic shooters of South Korea
ISSF rifle shooters
People from Yeongju
Shooters at the 2018 Asian Games
Asian Games competitors for South Korea
Sportspeople from North Gyeongsang Province
20th-century South Korean people
21st-century South Korean people